Television Rogers can refer to:

Rogers Television, a network of community television in Canada
Télévision Rogers, sister network in French